Lophopodidae is a family of bryozoans belonging to the order Plumatellida.

Genera:
 Asajirella Oda & Mukai, 1989
 Lophopodella Rousselet, 1904
 Lophopus Dumortier, 1835

References

Bryozoan families